Elaeocarpus prunifolius is a species of flowering plant in the Elaeocarpaceae family. It is found in Bangladesh and India. It is threatened by habitat loss.

References

prunifolius
Flora of Bangladesh
Flora of Assam (region)
Vulnerable plants
Taxonomy articles created by Polbot